J. L. Hemphill House, also known as the Lowe House or Woodie House, is a historic home located at Wilkesboro, Wilkes County, North Carolina. It was built in 1899, and is a two-story, Queen Anne style frame dwelling.  It has a central hip-roofed block with slightly projecting gabled "wings" on all four sides.  It features a -story polygonal corner tower with bell-cast roof and finial and one-story wraparound porch with sawnwork decoration.

It was listed on the National Register of Historic Places in 1982.

References

Houses on the National Register of Historic Places in North Carolina
Queen Anne architecture in North Carolina
Houses completed in 1899
Houses in Wilkes County, North Carolina
National Register of Historic Places in Wilkes County, North Carolina